Has Anyone Seen My Girl? is a 2020 Russian drama film directed by Angelina Nikonova.

It was theatrically released in Russia on February 4, 2021 by Central Partnership.

Plot 
Smart moviegoers Sergei and Kira were considered the most beautiful couple in St. Petersburg. And suddenly they got divorced. Kira went to another city, and Sergei died. Many years later, Kira realized that she would never be happy again.

Cast 
 Viktoriya Isakova as Kira
 Anna Chipovskaya as Kira in youth
 Alexander Gorchilin as Sergei
 Yuri Borisov as Sergei Ⅱ
 Yuri Chursin as Maksim
 Mariya Shalayeva as Liza
 Aleksey Zolotovitsky as Burovsky
 Ivan Dobronravov as Tolik

Critical response
Zinaida Pronchenko, in her review, notes that the film has predictably all the shortcomings inherent in the pop biopic genre, the model is not given to the artist, although they take it in different poses. Nothing is clear about Dobrotvorsky from the plot.

According to Stanislav Zelvensky, despite all the numerous formal weaknesses (finally, let's add the old-fashioned, erroneous use of voice-over and an awkward metafinal), the film deserves attention like any work done sincerely and with some thoughts.

References

External links 
 

2021 films
2021 drama films
2020s Russian-language films
Russian drama films
Russian biographical drama films
Films based on autobiographical novels